Sportpark Hofbrouckerlaan is a cricket ground in Oegstgeest, Netherlands. The first and to date only recorded match on the ground came in 2003, when the ground held a Women's One Day International between the Netherlands Women and Scotland Women at the 2003 IWCC Trophy.

The ground is used by Ajax Cricket Club and Leidse Studenten Cricket Club.

References

External links
Sportpark Hofbrouckerlaan at ESPNcricinfo
Sportpark Hofbrouckerlaan at CricketArchive

 

Cricket grounds in the Netherlands
Sports venues in South Holland
Sport in Oegstgeest